Rythdale is a bounded rural locality in Victoria, Australia,  south-east of Melbourne's central business district, located within the Shire of Cardinia local government area. Rythdale recorded a population of 33 at the 2021 census.

History

Rythedale Post Office opened on 22 June 1925, was renamed Rythdale around 1930 and closed in 1944.

Today

Rythdale forms part of the Australian Rules ROC Football Club (Rythdale, Officer, Cardinia) competing in the Mornington Peninsula Nepean Football League.

See also
 Shire of Pakenham – Rythdale was previously within this former local government area.

References

Shire of Cardinia